The band-tailed seedeater (Catamenia analis) is a species of bird in the family Thraupidae.
It is found in Argentina, Bolivia, Chile, Colombia, Ecuador, and Peru.
Its natural habitats are subtropical or tropical high-altitude shrubland and heavily degraded former forest.

Gallery

References

band-tailed seedeater
Birds of the Andes
Birds of Argentina
band-tailed seedeater
Taxonomy articles created by Polbot